Harry Mozley Stevens (14 June 1855 – 3 May 1934) was a food concessionaire from England who has been variously attributed as the inventor of the hot dog, but has nevertheless been credited with being America's foremost ballpark concessionaire. In 1887 he founded Harry M Stevens Inc., a stadium concessions company which was based in Cranbury, New Jersey until it was acquired by Aramark on December 12, 1994. 

Harry Stevens was born in London in 1855 but had connections to Litchurch in Derby, England. He emigrated to Niles, Ohio in the 1880s. On arrival in the States, he became obsessed with baseball and quickly made his mark by designing and selling the sport's first scorecard - a design still in use to this day. By 1900, Stevens had secured contracts to supply refreshments at several Major League ballparks across the US. He also began to sell scorecards to fans with the phrase You can't tell the players without a scorecard.

Stevens is credited with telling the story that at the home opener of the New York Giants on a cold April day in 1901 there was limited demand for ice cream. He decided to sell German sausages known as 'dachshund sausages.' When the staff ran out of the wax paper on which the sausages were traditionally served Stevens had one of his employees purchase some buns and had the staff place the hot dogs in the buns, creating what became known today as the hot dog. A cartoonist, recording the event, was reputed to have been unable to spell dachshund, so wrote hot dogs instead. The family has since acquired the original cartoon and has preserved it.

Memorials
Despite many disputes over the claim to Stevens having been the inventor of the hot dog, in early 2013 Derby City Council and Derby Civic Society jointly announced they would erect a Blue plaque to his memory on his first marital home at 21 Russell Street in Derby, England.

On June 30, 2013, Niles, Ohio resurrected "Harry Stevens Hot Dog Day".  The downtown event included live music, weiner dog races and costume contests, a hot dog dressing (sauce) contest, baseball clinic, and cornhole tournament among other activities.  Food and merchandise vendors were also on-hand.

Notes
 Rippon, Nicola, Derbyshire's Own, The History Press, 2006, .

References

1855 births
1934 deaths
People from Derby
English emigrants to the United States
Hot dogs